Hilton is a village and civil parish in County Durham, about  northwest of Darlington. Nearby places are Ingleton and Staindrop.

The 2011 Census recorded the parish population as less than 100. Information is kept in the parish of Bolam.

Hilton Hall is a former mediaeval chantry chapel that has been converted into a house, with 17th- and 18th-century additions. It is a Grade II* listed building.

References

Bibliography

External links

Civil parishes in County Durham
Villages in County Durham